Fort Ney may refer to:

Fort Ney (de Roppe), Belfort, north eastern France
Fort Ney (Fransecky), Strasbourg, France